Mint Hill is a suburban town in southeastern Mecklenburg and northwestern Union counties in the U.S. state of North Carolina, it is a major suburb on the outskirts of Charlotte and near the Cabarrus County line. The population was 22,722 at the 2010 census.

Geography

Demographics

2020 census

As of the 2020 United States census, there were 26,450 people, 9,627 households, and 7,386 families residing in the town.

2000 census
At the 2000 census there were 14,922 people, 5,581 households, and 4,431 families living in the town. The population density was 702.9 people per square mile (271.4/km2). There were 5,763 housing units at an average density of 271.5 per square mile (104.8/km2).  The racial makeup of the town was 78.42% White, 12.34% African American, 0.61% Native American, 2.53% Asian, 0.03% Pacific Islander, 4.08% from other races, and 1.99% from two or more races. Hispanic or Latino of any race were 8.29%.

Of the 5,581 households 33.9% had children under the age of 18 living with them, 68.9% were married couples living together, 7.4% had a female householder with no husband present, and 20.6% were non-families. 16.4% of households were one person and 5.2% were one person aged 65 or older. The average household size was 2.67 and the average family size was 2.98.

The age distribution was 24.3% under the age of 18, 7.1% from 18 to 24, 28.5% from 25 to 44, 29.8% from 45 to 64, and 10.3% 65 or older. The median age was 39 years. For every 100 females, there were 98.1 males. For every 100 females age 18 and over, there were 95.8 males.

The median household income was $60,822 and the median family income  was $67,055. Males had a median income of $45,368 versus $30,467 for females. The per capita income for the town was $26,487. About 2.9% of families and 4.8% of the population were below the poverty line, including 4.9% of those under age 18 and 11.4% of those age 65 or over.

Schools and libraries
The children of Mint Hill within Mecklenburg County attend Charlotte-Mecklenburg Schools.

Elementary schools in the Mint Hill city limits include Bain, Lebanon Road, and Mint Hill. Clear Creek Elementary is across from the Mint Hill city limits and serves a section of Mint Hill. Another section of Mint Hill is zoned to J. H. Gunn Elementary School.

Middle schools serving Mint Hill include Northeast Middle, and Mint Hill Middle, both in Mint Hill, as well as Albermarle Road Middle School, outside of Mint Hill. High school students in Mecklenburg County attend either Independence High School in Mint Hill, Rocky River High School in Mint Hill, or David W. Butler High School in Matthews.

Charter schools Queen's Grant Community School and Queen's Grant High School are also located in the town.

Mint Hill is served by a branch of the Charlotte Mecklenburg Library.

References

External links
 Town website of Mint Hill, NC
 Mint Hill Chamber of Commerce
 The Mint Hill Times
 Mint Hill branch of the Public Library of Charlotte and Mecklenburg County
 Mint Hill Historical Society

Towns in Mecklenburg County, North Carolina
Towns in Union County, North Carolina
Towns in North Carolina